Mount Bates is the highest point of Norfolk Island, an external territory of Australia, at 319 metres (1,047 ft) above sea level.

External links
  

Landforms of Norfolk Island
Bates
Mountains of Oceania